Nichlas Rohde (born 1 January 1992) is a Danish footballer who plays as a centre forward for Liria FK.

A mentally strong and direct attacker, who is brave when fighting for the ball.

Early life
Born in Roskilde, Rohde started playing football at a youth level with Jyllinge FC, Ølstykke FC and Brøndby, until he was picked up by FC Nordsjælland in January 2009. He played the 2010–11 season for FCN's under-19 squad, helping the team to a 3rd-place finish, and ending the season as league top scorer with 20 goals.

Senior career

FC Nordsjælland
Rohde made his league debut on 7 August 2011, coming on as a substitute for Matti Lund Nielsen against Silkeborg. He scored an equalizing goal within 12 minutes of coming off the bench, bringing the score to 1–1, FCN eventually winning the game 2–1. Having made two league appearances and one in Europe against Sporting Lisbon, Rohde was rewarded with a -year contract on 23 August 2011.

Career statistics

Club

Honours

FC Nordsjælland 
Winner
Danish Superliga: 2011-12

Breiðablik 
Winner
Icelandic League Cup: 2013

Runner-up
Icelandic Premier League: 2012

References

External links 
 Profile at Akademisk Boldklbu (AB) 
 
 

1992 births
Living people
Danish men's footballers
People from Roskilde
Association football forwards
Ølstykke FC players
FC Nordsjælland players
Nichlas Rohde
Akademisk Boldklub players
Boldklubben 1908 players
Skovshoved IF players
Danish Superliga players
Danish 1st Division players
Danish 2nd Division players
Danish expatriate men's footballers
Expatriate footballers in Iceland
Danish expatriate sportspeople in Iceland
Sportspeople from Region Zealand